Don "Magic" Juan, (born Donald Campbell November 30, 1950, also known as The Chairman of the Board, Archbishop Don 'Da Magic' Juan, Bishop Don Magic Juan, or just Bishop) is an American former pimp, preacher, hip hop personality, actor, and fashion designer from Chicago. He is also the founder of the Players Ball, an annual celebration of his former "pimp" lifestyle.

Career

Pimp
Regarding his career as a pimp, Campbell noted, "I'd see a pimp, so I'd pattern myself after that. I'd read Iceberg Slim. I'd watch Superfly, with the flashy cars and clothes. I went for all of that. When I came to the game I was 16."  During the 1970s, Campbell operated a record store that doubled as a "turn out joint" to recruit additional prostitutes.

Church minister
In an interview with Joan Rivers Bishop Don Magic Juan admitted that while smoking PCP, he realized that he should dedicate his life to God.
In 1985, Campbell ceased operating as a pimp, stating, "God don't want me to do it no more...[i]t was like something grabbed my heart to convince me." He was later ordained as a minister by Dr. F. L. Johnson of the Christian Ministers Congress Non-Denominational Council, Inc., and in 1989, he opened the Magic World Christian Kingdom Church of the Royal Family.

Celebrity

Juan's climb to mainstream celebrity began when he met Snoop Dogg backstage at the Soul Train awards.  They soon became good friends, and Juan became Snoop's "spiritual advisor". He also acts as a "spiritual advisor" to Gina Gershon as seen in an episode of the documentary series Rocked with Gina Gershon. In 2003, Snoop Dogg stated that he was working on producing Juan's first album  and Juan did release a compilation album of '70s and '80s soul classics in 2006, titled Green is for the Money, Gold is for the Honeys.

Juan has had several supporting roles in music, videos, and live stage shows of established rap artists, including an appearance in the B-Real music video "Los Angeles" directed by Hugo V., a remix of 50 Cent's "P.I.M.P.", (as well as being featured in the music video), and a spoken-word interlude on Da Brat's album Unrestricted. He is also featured in Twista's song "Pimp On" from the Kamikaze album, and "Bo$$ Playa" from Snoop Dogg's album Paid tha Cost to Be da Boss. Juan can also be seen as part of Snoop's entourage in movies such as Starsky & Hutch and Old School. His TV appearances include the Ice-T episode of Behind the Music, Girls Next Door, The Daily Show, Rob and Big, Viva La Bam, Pimps Up, Ho's Down, a documentary about the pimping lifestyle, and the Hughes Brothers-directed documentary American Pimp.

Juan was caricatured in Aaron McGruder's comic strip The Boondocks for a November–December 2003 story arc during which Boondocks characters Huey and Caesar were attempting to find then-U.S. National Security Advisor Condoleezza Rice a boyfriend. He also had a small role as a pimp associated to the character Money Mike, played by Katt Williams, in the film Friday After Next starring Ice Cube. Juan made a brief appearance on the first episode of Mind of Mencia. In 2007, Juan was honored with his own colorway of the McNally skateboard shoe by Emerica.

Juan has appeared in Rugged Entertainment's Kiss and Tail: The Hollywood Jumpoff, directed by Thomas Gibson and produced by Peter Spirer.  The film was featured on Showtime. He also appeared in the television show American Gangster during the episode about Willie Lloyd and the Vice Lords, and he has been a guest on Manswers.

He is featured on the 2011 song "Talent Show" by Snoop Dogg and Wiz Khalifa from their joint album Mac & Devin Go to High School.

Discography

Albums 
 2006: Green is for the Money, Gold is for the Honeys Vol. 1  (Avatar Records)

Guest appearances 
{| class="wikitable" style="font-size: 9pt"
!width="33" | Year
!width="170"| Song
!width="170"| Artist
!width="170"| Album
|-
|align="center|1999
|"Pimpin' Ain't Easy"
|align="center"|Rappin' 4-Tay
|align="center"|Introduction to Mackin'''
|-
|rowspan="2" align="center|2000
|"A Word From ... Da Bishop Don "Magic" Juan"
|align="center"|Da Brat
|align="center"|Unrestricted|-
|"It' Ain't Easy"
|align="center"|Mddl Fngz
|align="center"|Live! From Da Manjah|-
|align="center|2002
|"Boss Playa"
|align="center"|Snoop Dogg
|align="center"|Paid tha Cost to Be da Boss|-
|rowspan="2" align="center|2003
|"A.D.I.D.A.C."
|align="center"|Snoop Dogg
|align="center"|Welcome 2 Tha Chuuch vol. 1|-
|"P.I.M.P"
|align="center"|50 Cent
|align="center"|Get Rich or Die Tryin|-
|align="center|2003
|"P.I.M.P. Remix"
|align="center"|50 Cent
|align="center"|P.I.M.P. - Single|-
|rowspan="3" align="center|2004
|"Pimp On"
|align="center"|Twista
|align="center"|Kamikaze|-
|"Church"
|align="center"|Pomona City Rydaz
|align="center"|Walking Game|-
|"Nuthin' Without Me"
|align="center"|Snoop Dogg
|align="center"|Welcome To Tha Chuuch vol. 4: Sunday School|-
|align="center|2006
|"Que Te Pica Remix"
|align="center"|Notch
|align="center"|Raised By The People|-
|align="center|2007
|"Musika"
|align="center"|KRS-One & Marley Marl
|align="center"|Hip Hop Lives|-
|align="center|2007
|"Intro (Blessin')"
|align="center"|Bankroll Jonez
|align="center"|UGK Records & Get Money Movement Presents Scroll Muzik|-
|-
|align="center|2007
|"Ballin On The West Side"
|align="center"|Ditch
|align="center"|Public Intoxication|-
|-
|align="center|2007
|"Rob & Big"
|align="center"|MTV
|align="center"|Bobby Light|-
|-
|align="center|2008
|"A Pimp’s Christmas Song"
|align="center"|Snoop Dogg
|align="center"|Snoop Dogg Presents Christmas In Tha Dogg House|}

 Filmography 

Film
 2012: Mac & Devin Go to High School - Student Services Guy
 2007: Redrum - Devil
 2005: Boss’n Up - Himself
 2003: Old School - Himself
 2004: Starsky & Hutch - Himself
 2003: S.W.A.T - Himself
 2002: Friday After Next - Himself
 2001: Deadly Rhapsody - Club MC
 1999: American Pimp - Himself
 1998: Pimps Up, Ho's Down - Himself
 1996: Original Gangstas - Big Brother (uncredited)

Television
 2015: Black-ish - Bishop Don Juan
 2006: Flavor of Love - Season 2, Episode 5 - Bishop Don "Magic" Juan
 2004: Eve - Comfort
 2004: MADtv - Bishop 'Rump Shaker' Robinson

 References 

 External links 
 

 [ Allmusic review of Green is for the Money, Gold is for the Honeys Vol. 1'']

 The Bishop articles on the Emerica site
Rare footage of Pastor Don Magic Juan, founder of Chicago's Magic World Christian Church

American pimps
Living people
Male actors from Chicago
1950 births